Radio Institute of Islamic Studies Malaysia or better known as Radio IKIM
(formerly known as IKIM.fm) is a radio station in Malaysia. IKIM is an abbreviation for the Institute of Islamic Understanding Malaysia, which is the operator of this radio station. Radio IKIM is the first Islamic radio station in Malaysia that operates for 24 hours. Radio IKIM was officially launched by the then Prime Minister, YAB Tun Dr. Mahathir Mohamad on 6 July 2001.

History 
Radio IKIM is transmitted using the frequency of 91.5 MHz (in the Klang Valley) and transmitted nationwide. Radio IKIM can also be heard in Singapore, the Batam islands in Indonesia, Brunei and southern Thailand (Satun, Songkhla, and Narathiwat). The frequency of this radio station was formerly used by RFM (now Red FM), before switching to 104.9 MHz (in the Klang Valley) in early 2000. Radio IKIM can also be followed online through it website.

In 2002, the frequency of Radio IKIM in Johor Bahru transmitted from Gunung Pulai was changed from 107.9 MHz to 106.2 MHz.

In the 2010s, Radio IKIM expanded its broadcasts to Miri on FM 104.0 MHz, Lahad Datu on FM 107.3 MHz and Tawau on FM 100.7 MHz to target Muslim listeners in the area. In addition, Radio IKIM added a transmitter in Balik Pulau, Penang  at 102.7 MHz to cover the southwestern area of Penang  where the Gunung Jerai FM 89.0 MHz transmitter cannot be received in that area.

In 2016, the frequency of Radio IKIM in Kuching was changed to FM 93.7 MHz, the original frequency was FM 93.6 MHz.

About 95% programme Radio IKIM presented in languages other than English and the rest in Arabic and English. Official estimates by The Nielsen Company (Malaysia), an international survey company on radios in Malaysia in their latest study as reported in Wave 2, 2010 show that around 786,000 listeners in Peninsular Malaysia follow this Islamic radio.

In June 2016, Radio IKIM upgraded the transmission frequency of Kedah and Perlis FM 89.0 MHz by moving the transmitter to Upper Gunung Jerai, to cover Kedah, Perlis, Penang and north Perak which allows Penang  and north Perak to receive Radio IKIM broadcasts at 89.0 MHz clearly. Previously, FM 89.0 MHz could not be received in Penang and North Perak, but FM 89.0 MHz was interrupted by a radio station from Thailand (Yala) in Penang.

Frequency 

Note: Langkawi Island can receive Radio IKIM broadcasts at 102.7 MHz from Bukit Genting or 89.0 MHz from Gunung Jerai.

See also 
 List of radio stations in Malaysia

External links 
 IKIM
 
 

Radio stations in Malaysia
Islamic radio stations
Radio stations established in 2001